Caenides hidaroides, commonly known as Aurivillius' recluse, is a species of butterfly in the family Hesperiidae. It is found in Guinea, Sierra Leone, Liberia, Ivory Coast, Ghana, Nigeria, Cameroon, the Republic of the Congo, the Central African Republic, the Democratic Republic of the Congo and western Tanzania. The habitat consists of forests.

References

Butterflies described in 1896
Hesperiinae
Butterflies of Africa
Taxa named by Per Olof Christopher Aurivillius